The 2018 FIVB Volleyball Women's Challenger Cup qualification  is a series of tournaments to decide teams which will play in the 2018 FIVB Volleyball Women's Challenger Cup. The 2018 Challenger Cup will feature 6 teams. Only one place will be allocated to the hosts. The remaining 5 places will be determined by a qualification process, in which entrants from among the other teams from the five FIVB confederations will compete.

Qualification summary
{| class="wikitable sortable" style="font-size:90%"
|-
!rowspan=2|Country
!rowspan=2|Confederation
!rowspan=2|Qualified as
!rowspan=2|Qualified on
!colspan=3|Previous appearances
!rowspan=2|Previous best performance
|-
!Total
!First
!Last
|-
|
|AVC
| Asian qualifier 3rd place
| 20 May 2018
|style="text-align:center"|0
|colspan=2 style="text-align:center"|None
|None
|-
|
|NORCECA
| North American qualifier champions
| 20 May 2018
|style="text-align:center"|0
|colspan=2 style="text-align:center"|None
|None
|-
|
|CSV
| South American qualifier runner-up
| 27 May 2018
|style="text-align:center"|0
|colspan=2 style="text-align:center"|None
|None
|-
|
|CSV
| Host country
| 15 June 2018
|style="text-align:center"|0
|colspan=2 style="text-align:center"|None
|None
|-
|
|CEV
| 2018 Golden League champions
| 17 June 2018
|style="text-align:center"|0
|colspan=2 style="text-align:center"|None
|None
|-
|
|CEV
| 2018 Golden League runner-up
| 17 June 2018
|style="text-align:center"|0
|colspan=2 style="text-align:center"|None
|None
|}

Confederation qualification

AVC (Asia and Oceania)

Venue:  Baluan Sholak Sports Palace, Almaty, Kazakhstan
Dates: 18–20 May 2018

Teams
  (round robin → qualified)
  (round robin)
  (round robin → qualified (withdrew))

Final positions (round robin)

CEV (Europe)

Teams

  (Golden league)
  (Golden league)
  (Golden league → final round → qualified)
  (Golden league → final round)
  (Golden league)
  (Golden league → final round)
  (Golden league)
  (Golden league → final round → qualified)
  (Golden league)
  (Golden league)
  (Golden league)
  (Golden league)

Golden league

Pool A

Pool B

Pool C

Final round
Venue:  László Papp Budapest Sports Arena, Budapest, Hungary
Dates: 14–15 June 2018
The finalists in the final round will qualify the 2018 FIVB Challenger Cup.

CSV (South America)

Venue:  Coliseo Manuel Bonilla, Lima, Peru
Dates: 25–27 May 2018

Teams
  (round robin)
  (round robin → qualified)
  (round robin → qualified as host country)
  (round robin)

Final positions (round robin)

NORCECA (North America)

Venue:  Edmonton Expo Centre, Edmonton, Canada
Dates: 17–20 May 2018

Teams
  (first round → final round)
  (first round)
  (first round)
  (first round → final round → qualified)
  (first round)

First round

Pool A

Pool B

Final positions (final round)
The winner will qualify to 2018 FIVB Volleyball Women's Challenger Cup

References

 
FIVB Volleyball Women's Challenger Cup qualification